Arturo Armando Coddou Geerdts  (1907-1955)  was a Chilean football midfielder.

References

External links

Chilean footballers
Chile international footballers
C.D. Arturo Fernández Vial footballers
Chilean Primera División players
1930 FIFA World Cup players
1900s births
1955 deaths
Association football midfielders